John Sutton (born 10 August 1948) is the Sir John Hicks Professor of Economics at the London School of Economics.

Education

Sutton received his undergraduate education at University College Dublin, a graduate degree from Trinity College Dublin, and earned his Ph.D. at University of Sheffield.

Career
He taught at the University of Sheffield before joining LSE in 1977. He has been a visiting associate professor at Tokyo University, a Marvin Bower Fellow at the Harvard Business School, and a visiting professor of economics at Harvard University, and at the Graduate School of Business, University of Chicago.

Sutton was also president of the Royal Economic Society from 2004 to 2007. He is a Foreign Honorary Member of the American Economic Association and a member of Executive and Supervisory Committee at CERGE-EI in Prague.

References 

20th-century Irish economists
Academics of the London School of Economics
Fellows of the Econometric Society
Alumni of the University of Sheffield
1948 births
Living people
21st-century British economists